Pseudophilotes bavius, the Bavius blue, is a butterfly of the family Lycaenidae. It is found in Morocco, Algeria, Bulgaria, Romania, Greece, Asia Minor, southern Russia and northern Kazakhstan. The species occurs in small isolated populations on flower-rich, dry grassland, on dry, stony slopes and on open patches in shrub and in vineyards on calcareous soil.

The wingspan is 24–30 mm. Adults are on wing from April to May and again from June to July in two generations per year. There is usually one prolonged generation a year with adults on wing from late April to mid-July. In Peloponnesus, a partial second generation may occur.

The larvae feed on Salvia species, including S. officinalis, S. nutans, S. verbenaca and S. verticillata. They feed mostly on the flowers, but sometimes also on the leaves. They are frequently found with ants. Hibernation takes place in the pupal stage.

Subspecies
Pseudophilotes bavius bavius (steppe of southern Russia, northern Kazakhstan)
Pseudophilotes bavius casimiri Hemming, 1932 (Peloponnesus)
Pseudophilotes bavius hungarica (Dioszeghy, 1913) (Transylvania)
Pseudophilotes bavius fatma (Oberthür, 1890) (Morocco: Middle Atlas, Algeria: Aures Mountains)
Pseudophilotes bavius egea (Herrich-Schäffer, [1852]) (Caucasus)
Pseudophilotes bavius macedonicus Schultze, 1958 (Macedonia)
Pseudophilotes bavius eitschbergeri (Koçak, 1975)  (Turkey)
Pseudophilotes bavius vanicola (Koçak, 1977)  (Turkey)

References

Butterflies described in 1832
Polyommatini
Butterflies of Europe